Walter Anthony "Red" Torphy (November 6, 1891 – February 11, 1980) was a professional baseball player. He appeared in three games in Major League Baseball at first base for the 1920 Boston Braves.

Torphy had an extensive career in minor league baseball, playing seventeen seasons. His professional career began in 1913 with the Worcester Busters of the New England League, and ended in 1929 with the Brockton Shoemakers in the same league.

Torphy was born in Fall River, Massachusetts, and died there in 1980.

External links 

Major League Baseball first basemen
Boston Braves players
Worcester Busters players
New Bedford Whalers (baseball) players
Fitchburg Burghers players
Manchester Textiles players
Lowell Grays players
New Haven Murlins players
New Haven Weissmen players
Waterbury Brasscos players
Pittsfield Hillies players
New Haven Profs players
Bridgeport Bears (baseball) players
Scranton Miners players
Nashville Vols players
Haverhill Hillies players
Brockton Shoemakers players
Baseball players from Massachusetts
Sportspeople from Fall River, Massachusetts
1891 births
1980 deaths